The Minsk trolleybus system serves the city of Minsk, the capital of Belarus. The system was opened in September 19, 1952. Nowadays it has more than 60 lines. The system is operated by the "Minsktrans" state enterprise. According to the Transportation Research Board, trolleybus system of Minsk is the second largest in the world.

History 
Construction of the Minsk trolleybus system started after a decree of the Council of Ministers of the BSSR (November 1949). The first line, opened on 19 September 1952, connected Train Passenger Station and the Round Square (now — Victory Square, total 6 km). 5 trolleybuses served the system on the opening day. The system was developing fast — in 1956, 39 trolleybuses were serving 16 km of lines.

Fare payment 
During Soviet times, a trolleybus ticket cost 4 kopecks. Currently, the ticket costs 60 copecks ($0.31).

Lines 
The system operates 61 (or 66) trolleybus lines.

Fleet 
Belarusian and English versions of "Minsktrans" official site give different number of active trolleybuses — 1251 or 990. According to the National Statistics Committee of the Republic of Belarus, 973 trolleybuses were used in Minsk in 2015.

4 trolleybus depots are currently in operation — No.2, No.3, No.4, No.5. The new depot is being built in Uručča district (northeastern part of Minsk).

Currently all trolleybuses are Belarusian-produced (by Belkommunmash and MAZ). ACSM-321 is the most common machine.

References

External links 
 State Enterprise "Minsktrans"

Transport in Minsk
Minsk
Minsk